Tamara Anne Hazleton (born December 1, 1947) is an American former competition swimmer who represented the United States as a 16-year-old at the 1964 Summer Olympics in Tokyo, Japan.  She competed in the preliminary heats of the women's 200-meter breaststroke and recorded a time of 2:55.0.

References

1947 births
Living people
American female breaststroke swimmers
Olympic swimmers of the United States
Sportspeople from Providence, Rhode Island
Swimmers at the 1964 Summer Olympics
21st-century American women